Alexei Petrovich Tsvetkov (also spelled as Aleksei Cvetkov; ; 2 February 1947 – 12 May 2022) was a Russian poet and essayist.

Biography

Alexei Tsvetkov, Russian-language émigré poet, translator, and essayist, was born in Ivano-Frankivsk (formerly Stanislaviv), Ukraine, grew up in Zaporizhia and briefly studied chemistry at the Odessa University, then history (1965–1968) and journalism (1971–1974) at the Moscow State University. Together with Sergey Gandlevsky, Bakhyt Kenjeev, and Alexander Soprovsky he founded the unofficial group of poets Moscow Time. In 1975 he was arrested and deported from Moscow and in the same year emigrated to the United States. He edited the emigre newspaper Russkaya Zhizn (San Francisco, 1976–77). Then he entered the University of Michigan graduate school and in 1983 was awarded a PhD degree. Tsvetkov taught Russian language and literature at Dickinson College, Pennsylvania, then worked as an international broadcaster at the Voice of America radio station. From 1989 until 2007 he worked in the same capacity at the Radio Free Europe/Radio Liberty, first in Munich, later in Prague. For many years Tsvetkov lived and worked as a freelance writer based in New York City. In 2018 he made aliyah and lived in Bat Yam, Israel.

Alexei Tsvetkov died in Wolfson Hospital in Holon, Israel on 12 May 2022. He was interred in Yarkon cemetery on 13 May.

Creative output

In the late 80s he stopped writing poetry and turned to prose. The unfinished novel Just a Voice, an autobiography of a fictitious Roman soldier (only the adolescence is covered) reflects Tsvetkov's idea of the Roman civilization as one of the summits in the history of the humanity. Alexei Tsvetkov has been considered one of the finest poets of his generation by such critics as A. Skvortsov, A. Lehrman, G. Smith, A. Zorin and poets Andrey Voznesensky, Sergey Gandlevsky, and Mikhail Aizenberg.

In 2004, after a 17-year break, Tsvetkov turned back to poetry and within a year and a half prepared a new book of poetry.
Alexei Tsvetkov also wrote and published poetry and essays in English.
In 2007 he was awarded Andrei Bely prize for poetry.

Published works

Sbornik p'es dlia zhizni solo (Collection of Pieces for Life Solo), Ann Arbor: Ardis, 1978.
Sostoianie sna (Dream State), Ann Arbor: Ardis, 1981.
Edem (Eden), Ann Arbor: Ardis, 1985.
Stikhotvoreniia (Poems), St. Petersburg: Pushkinskii fond, 1996.
Divno molvit'. Sobranie stikhotvorenii (Wonderful to Utter), St. Petersburg: Pushkinskii fond, 2001.
Prosto golos (Just a Voice), Nezavisimaya Gazeta, Moscow, 2002.
Bestiarii (Bestiary), Ekaterinburg: Evdokiia, 2004.
Shekspir otdykhaet (Shakespeare at Rest), St. Petersburg: Pushkinskii fond, 2006.
Imena liubvi (Names of Love), Moscow: Novoe izdatel'stvo, 2007.
Edem i drugoe (Eden, and More), Moscow: OGI, 2007.
Atlanticheskii dnevnik (The Atlantic Diary), Moscow: Novoe izdatel'stvo, 2007.
Rovnyi veter (The Even Wind), Moscow: Novoe izdatel'stvo, 2008.
Skazka na noch (Bedtime Story), Moscow: Novoe izdatel'stvo, 2010.
Detektor smysla (Sense Detector), Moscow: ARGO-RISK; Knizhnoe obozrenie, 2010.
Poslednii Kontinent (The Last Continent), Kharkiv: Folio, 2012.

References

Other sources 

Lowe, David. Russian Writings Since 1953. A Critical History. Ungar, NY, 1987.
Панн, Л. Нескучный сад. – Hermitage Publishers, 1998.
Смит, Дж. Взгляд извне. Статьи о русской поэзии и поэтике. М.: Языки славянской культуры, 2002.

External links

In English:
 Personal English poetry blog
 Bibliography of poetry in English translation
 Leaving Prague in Poetry magazine
 Two early poems by Alexei Tsvetkov English translations by Alex Cigale

In Russian:
 
 Homepage on the Vavilon site
 Homepage on the Neoficial'naia poeziia site
 Zhurnal'nyi zal
 Personal Russian poetry blog

1947 births
2022 deaths
Russian male poets
Russian male novelists
Russian male essayists
Soviet emigrants to the United States
American writers of Russian descent
Writers from Moscow
Moscow State University alumni
Writers from Prague
20th-century essayists
20th-century Russian male writers
People from Zaporizhzhia
Odesa University alumni